Nathalis is a genus of butterflies in the family Pieridae.

Species
Nathalis iole Boisduval, 1836 – dainty sulphur or dwarf yellow
Nathalis plauta Doubleday, 1847

References

Coliadinae
Pieridae genera
Taxa named by Jean Baptiste Boisduval